The 2014 Formula Renault 3.5 Series season was a multi-event motor racing championship for open wheel, formula racing cars held across Europe. The championship featured drivers competing in 3.5 litre Formula Renault single seat race cars that conformed to the technical regulations for the championship. The 2014 season was the tenth Formula Renault 3.5 Series season organized by Renault Sport. The season began at Autodromo Nazionale Monza on 12 April and finished on 19 October at Circuito de Jerez.

Carlos Sainz Jr. clinched the championship title with seven race wins, after his compatriot and rival Roberto Merhi retired in the penultimate race of the season. Sainz, Jr. also became the first Red Bull Junior Team driver to win the championship. Merhi was the only other driver to score more than two wins, but he lost the runner-up position to Pierre Gasly – another Red Bull backed driver – after retiring in the second Jerez race. Fortec Motorsports driver Oliver Rowland won races at Alcañiz and Jerez, finishing fourth. His teammate Sergey Sirotkin completed the top five with a win on home soil at Moscow Raceway. Will Stevens and Norman Nato were the other drivers to achieve race wins in the season; Stevens won at Monza and Jerez, bookending the season, while Nato was the winner of the Monaco Grand Prix support race, and also won at the Hungaroring.

Teams and drivers

Driver changes
Changed teams
 After two seasons with Pons Racing, Zoël Amberg switched to the AVF team.
 William Buller, who raced a part-season with Zeta Corse in 2013, moved to Arden Motorsport.
 Pietro Fantin, who drove for Arden Caterham in 2013, switched to International Draco Racing.
 Jazeman Jaafar changed teams from Carlin to ISR.
 Nikolay Martsenko switched from Pons Racing to Comtec Racing.
 Carlos Sainz Jr. who raced a part-season with Zeta Corse in 2013 alongside his GP3 Series campaign, moved to the DAMS team.
 Sergey Sirotkin switched from ISR to Fortec Motorsports.
 Lotus F1 test driver Marco Sørensen moved to Tech 1 Racing after two years with Lotus.
 Oliver Webb, who raced with Fortec Motorsports in 2013, returned for the Monza round of the series with Pons Racing. Webb competed with the team in 2011.

Entering/Re–Entering FR3.5
 Pierre Gasly, the 2013 Eurocup Formula Renault 2.0 champion, joined the series with Arden Motorsport.
 Formula Renault 2.0 Alps runner-up and sporadic Eurocup Formula Renault 2.0 racer Luca Ghiotto made his Formula Renault 3.5 début with International Draco Racing.
 Eurocup Formula Renault driver Roman Mavlanov and DTM driver Roberto Merhi moved to the championship with Zeta Corse.
 Eurocup Formula Renault 2.0 runner-up Oliver Rowland joined British team Fortec Motorsports.
 Auto GP driver Meindert van Buuren graduated to the series with Pons Racing.
 Matthieu Vaxivière, who finished tenth in the 2013 Eurocup Formula Renault 2.0, entered the championship with Lotus.
 Beitske Visser, who raced in ADAC Formel Masters, made her début in the series with AVF.

Leaving FR3.5
 Riccardo Agostini, who raced for Zeta Corse in one meeting in 2013, moved to the European Formula 3 Championship with EuroInternational.
 2010 champion Mikhail Aleshin, who drove for Tech 1 Racing in 2013, moved to the IndyCar Series for 2014, racing for Schmidt Peterson Motorsports.
 António Félix da Costa, who finished third for Arden Caterham in 2013, joined the DTM series with BMW.
 Carlos Huertas, who drove for Carlin in 2013, moved to the IndyCar Series for 2014 driving for Dale Coyne Racing.
 Kevin Magnussen, the 2013 champion with DAMS, graduated to Formula One, replacing Sergio Pérez at McLaren.
 Nico Müller, who finished fifth for International Draco Racing in 2013, moved to the DTM series with Audi.
 André Negrão, who drove for International Draco Racing in 2013, joined the GP2 Series with Arden International.
 Arthur Pic, who drove for AV Formula in 2013, entered the GP2 Series with Campos Racing.
 Stoffel Vandoorne, who finished second for Fortec Motorsports in 2013, joined the GP2 Series with ART Grand Prix.

Mid-season changes
 Tech 1 Racing fielded their second car for Alfonso Celis Jr., who made his series début at the Nürburgring. At the Hungaroring and the Circuit Paul Ricard, the seat was occupied by Nicholas Latifi.
 Nikolay Martsenko left the series prior the Monaco round due to financial issues.
 Andrea Roda joined Comtec Racing for the round in Monaco.
 Cameron Twynham joined Comtec Racing for the round at the Nürburgring.
 Richie Stanaway, who previously raced with Lotus in 2012, returned to the team, replacing injured Matthieu Vaxivière.
 Oliver Webb, who concentrated on LMP2 sportscars for the 2014 season, was replaced by Eurocup Formula Renault 2.0 driver Óscar Tunjo from Spa onwards.
 Esteban Ocon joined Comtec Racing for the rounds at the Hungaroring and Paul Ricard.

Race calendar and results
The calendar for the 2014 season was announced on 20 October 2013, the final day of the 2013 season. The championship visited the Circuito de Jerez for the first time, and returned to the Nürburgring. Races at the Red Bull Ring and Circuit de Barcelona-Catalunya were removed from the schedule, from 2013.

Championship standings
Points system
Points were awarded to the top 10 classified finishers.

Drivers' Championship

Teams' Championship

 Polesitter for each race in bold. No points were awarded.
 Driver who recorded fastest lap denoted in italics. No points were awarded.
 Driver who retired but was classified denoted by †.

References

External links
 Renault-Sport official website

Formula Renault 3.5
Formula Renault 3.5
World Series Formula V8 3.5 seasons
Renault 3.5